William Wootton may refer to:
William Wootton (politician), MP for Gatton 
Billy Wootton, footballer